In music, Op. 102 stands for Opus number 102. Compositions that are assigned this number include:

 Beethoven – Cello Sonatas Nos. 4 and 5
 Brahms – Double Concerto
 Dvořák – Cello Concerto
 Mendelssohn – Songs without Words, Book VIII
 Saint-Saëns – Violin Sonata No. 2
 Schumann – Five Stücke im Volkston for piano and cello
 Shostakovich – Piano Concerto No. 2